The following list is a discography of production by Lex Luger, an American record producer. It includes a list of songs produced, co-produced and remixed by Luger specified by year, artist, album and title.

Singles produced

2009

Waka Flocka Flame -  Salute Me Or Shoot Me 2
"Hard" 
"I Am An Illusion" (ft. La Chat)
"I'm Just Livin Life"

Wes Fif - Just Watch Me
"What I Want"
"In My Zone" ft. C-Ride

OJ Da Juiceman - Alaska In Atlanta
"Midget"
"In The Club" feat. Bobby Valentino
"Vegetarian"
"Early Morning Trappin"

Lex Luger and Waka Flocka Flame - Dj Zazu & Jonay Presents Dat Duffy Vol. 1 hosted By Lex Luger & Waka Flocka
"So Tired" by Waka Flocka Flame ft. Frenchie
"S.E.X." by Waka Flocka Flame ft. Lil Cap
"Gangsta Shit" by Dirty Smurf
"To Da Max" by Sean Teezy ft. Waka Flocka Flame, Roscoe Dash & Travis Porter

2010

La Chat - Krumbz 2 Brickz
"Gimme Room" (ft. Mazerratti Moe & Certy Mac)

2 Chainz - Trap-A-Velli 2: (The Residue)
"Fuck Da Roof"

Lil B
"I Go Woogie"

Sharoyce Antwan - Heavenly Teabag: The Nutz Flying Atop Your Ceiling
"These Niggaz" (ft. nWo)
"Santa Clause" (ft. Bros)

Yung BergYung Berg - I Want U (Prod. By Lex Luger) | Stream & Listen [New Song]
"I Want U"

Bape Jonez - Clock Werk Shawty (Hosted By Calico Jonez)
"So Gangsta" ft. Da Kid, Mykko Montana, Gucci Mane & Calico Jonez
"Off The Chain"
"I Clock In"

Waka Flocka Flame - Lebron Flocka James
"Wats Banging" (ft. Tay Beatz, Gorilla Zoe, (prod. with Tay Beatz)
"Gucci Got Me Straight"   (prod. with Tay Beatz)
"Go Duffy " (ft. TC & Emani)   (prod. with Tay Beatz)
"Hands" (ft. Gorilla Zoe)
"Hard N Da Paint" 
"All I Got" (ft. David Blayne)
"Off Da Chain" (ft. David Blayne & Suga Shane)
"Swagger Right"
"Throwin Fingers" (ft. Rich Kid Shawty & Papoose)
"F*ck Da Police" (ft. Cartel)  (prod. with Tay Beatz)
"Call Waka" (ft. Cartel, La Chat & Gucci Mane)  (prod. with Tay Beatz)

Yun Jinx - Comic Book Swagg
"Comic Book Swagg"

Lil Scrappy - On Point
 "On Point"

Kebo Gotti - Trap Music Time Edition
 "Exotic"

Gorilla Zoe - Walkin Money Machine
 "Listen"

Gorilla Zoe - Gorilla Ape Shit
 "Phow"

Gorilla Zoe - Stupid Cupid Shawty
 "My Goodies" ft. Lika Joon

Gorilla Zoe - Engraved In Stone
 "Inspector Gadget"
 "Wrecking Ball"

Ray Dolla 
 "Ballin Time" ft. Just Rich Gates
 "Plays" 
 "You Don't Wanna Do That"
 "My Digi"

Gorilla Zoe - DJ Bobby Black Presents Gorilla Zoe - Diamonds, Dope And Dimez
 "Diamonds, Dope, And Dimez"  
 "I'm Coming"  
 "Robbery"  
 "Watching"

Gorilla Zoe - 8 Track The Grand Closing
 "Be Real"  
 "Get"  
 "Name On"  
 "Numbers"  
 "Said I Wouldnt Be Nothing"

Ace Hood - The Statement
"Real Shit"
"Hustle Hard"

Maino - DJ Haze - Still Coutin' My Money
"Lick Season" (ft. Haitian Fresh  Rick Ross, & French Montana)

OJ da Juiceman - O.R.A.N.G.E
"Do Dat" (feat. Bobby V)
"I'm That Guy"

Rick Ross - Teflon Don
"B.M.F. (Blowin' Money Fast)" (feat. Styles P)
"MC Hammer" (feat. Gucci Mane)

Rick Ross - Official Ciroc Mixtape
"Where You From" (feat. Project Pat)

Fabolous - There Is No Competition 2: The Grieving Music EP
"Lights Out"

Soulja Boy Tell 'Em - Best Rapper
"Digital"
"I'm Boomin'"
"The Blues"
"What About My Clientele"

Waka Flocka Flame - Flockaveli
"Bustin' at 'Em" (with Souhside)
"Hard in da Paint"
"TTG (Trained to Go)" (feat. French Montana, YG Hootie, Joe Moses, Suge Gotti & Baby Bomb)
"Bang" (feat. YG Hootie & Slim Dunkin)
"Young Money/Bricksquad" (feat. Gudda Gudda)
"Grove St. Party" (feat. Kebo Gotti)
"Karma" (feat. YG Hootie, Popa Smurf & Slim Dunkin)
"Live by the Gun" (feat. Ra Diggs & Uncle Murda)
"G-Check" (feat. YG Hootie, Bo Deal & Joe Moses)
"Snake in the Grass" (feat. Cartier Kitten)
"Fuck This Industry"

Slim Thug - Tha Thug Show
"How We Do It" (featuring Rick Ross)

Tyga - Well Done 
"Well Done"
"Like Me"

Game - Brake Lights
"Get 'Em" (featuring Waka Flocka Flame)

Kanye West - My Beautiful Dark Twisted Fantasy
"See Me Now" (featuring Beyoncé Knowles, Charlie Wilson & Big Sean) (Produced with Kanye West and No I.D.)

OJ da Juiceman - 6 Ringz (The Michael Jordan Edition)
"6 Ringz"
"I Got Ringz"
"My Fist"
"Sausage" (featuring Dre)
"Own My Own Team"
"I Remember"

Rocko - Rocko Dinero
"Just In Case"
"Us" (featuring Yo Gotti & Future)

Wooh Da Kid - Black Out
"No Romance"
"Back Against the Wall"

Triple C's - Color Cut Clarity
"Walking On Water"

Lil Scrappy - DJ Greg Street & Lil Scrappy – Dat's Her? She's Bad
"Overgrind" ft. Young Chu

Lil Scrappy -  Strictly 4 The Traps N Trunks 8  
 "Let You Tell It" 
 "Overgrind" (ft. Young Chu)

Jim Jones -  Strictly 4 The Traps N Trunks 8  
"Gretzky (Remix)" (ft. Cam’ron, Vado & Yo Gotti)

Outlaw - Blok Hugger Boss
"Black Lambo"

Diamond - Cocaine Waitress
"Bottle Poppin" (ft. Young Chu)
"Hit Dat Hoe" (ft. Waka Flocka Flame)
"NFL" (ft. 2 Chainz)

Zone 6 Sinister -  Tales from the Trappers Paradise
"Dope"
"Decisions" (unreleased track)
"Zone 6 Sosa"

French Montana -  Coke Boys
"Whip" (ft. 2 Chainz & Soulja Boy)

Soufboi - Street Made 3
"What I Like To Do"
"Love When They Hatin"

2011

Bigg K - Doomsday 
 "Let Him In"

Trouble - Green Light
"Flexxin"

Trouble - December 17th
"Patnaz Got Stretches" (ft. Alley Boy)

Gangsta Boo - Foreva Gangsta
"Need A Gangsta Boo" (ft. Shawty Lo)

U.S.D.A. - CTE OR Nothing
"Turned Out"
"Zoning"

Kebo Gotti - Global Warming
"Ratchet" (ft. Waka Flocka Flame)
"Exotic"
"Grove St. Party" (ft. Waka Flocka Flame)

French Montana -  Mister 16 (Casino Life)
"Buko Money" (feat. Suss One & Slim Thug)
"Whut Up Doe" (feat. Slim Thug)
"Take It Off" (feat. Waka Flocka Flame, YG & Joe Moses)
"Ridiculous"

Yo Gotti -  Cocaine Muzik 6 (Gangsta Of The Year)
"Ion Like Them"

Mpulse
"Derrick Rose"

2Eleven - CTE 2K11
"Check Me Out"

Big Stacksss
"Trap Starz"

Yung Berg - Mr. Ward (Hosted by DJ ill Will, DJ Woogie & DJ Rockstar)
"Intro"
"What They Do"

Zone 6 Sinister - Tales From The 6 Chapter 3
"Horses"

Coco Kiss - Prototype
"Lap Dance" (ft. Jim Jones)

Mims - Open Bars
"Vroom Vroom" (ft. 13)

Fluid Outrage
"Fuck a Drought"

Ro.G
"Psycho"

Pill - Strictly 4 The Traps N Trunks 13 (Hosted By Future & Rocko) 
"No Play"

A Mafia - What The Streets Made Me
"2050"

Mike Fresh and Sonny Digital - FreshLife 
"Talkin' Money"

Chop
"Drop On 'Em" ft. Rick Ross

Bricksquad - Bricksquad Mafia (Gucci Mane Presents)
 "We Taken Bricks"
 "Pass"
 "Everything Bricksquad"

Avatar Young Blaze - Danny Darko
"Mask Up, Dump Off"

Layne Harper - Life in the Fast Layne Fridays
"Air Em' Out"

Kanye West & Jay-Z - Watch the Throne
"H•A•M" (Produced with Kanye West and Mike Dean)

Meek Mill - Dreamchasers
Work ft. Rick Ross

Gilbere Forte - "Eyes Of Veritas"
Die For You

OJ da Juiceman - Culinary Art School 2
 "Juice Where You Been"
 "Sell Chickens"
 "Clockin'"
 "Hundreds"
 "Down For Too Long"

U.S.D.A. - The Afterparty
"Zoning"

Snoop Dogg - Doggumentary
"Platinum" (featuring R. Kelly)

Wiz Khalifa - Cabin Fever (mixtape)
"Taylor Gang" (featuring Chevy Woods)
"GangBang" (featuring Big Sean)
"Hustlin'"
"Wtf"
"Errday" (featuring Juicy J)

Giggs - "Take Your Hats Off"
"Gangsta Hop" (featuring Waka Flocka Flame)
"Middle Fingers" (featuring Waka Flocka Flame, Gunna Dee, Killa Ki)
"Take Your Hats Off"

Rick Ross - Ashes to Ashes
 "9 Piece" (featuring Lil' Wayne)
 "9 Piece (Remix)" (featuring Lil' Wayne & T.I.)

Alex Niedt & Flash
"Hold Me Down"

Juicy J - Rubba Band Business (mixtape)
"Stunna's Do" (featuring Billy Wes)
"Smokin' And Sippin"
"Rattin' Azz"
"So Much Money"
"Niggaz Got Problems"
"I Ain't Sparin' Niggas"
"Flip That Bitch A Few Times"
"Get Me High" (featuring Reno & V Slash)
"Boom" (featuring V Slash)
"Niggaz Violate"
"Do It Big"
"Take Sum"
"Hood Sprung"
"Dread Shakin'" (featuring V Slash & Reno)
"I'm 100"
"That's What I'm Cockin'" (featuring Sno)
"Girl After Girl" (featuring Nicki Minaj & Gucci Mane)
"$$$ Signs" (Three 6 Mafia, Rick Ross & Billy Wes)
"Party" (featuring Three 6 Mafia & Roscoe Dash)

Tyga - Black Thoughts 2 (mixtape)
"Lap Dance"
"Bad Bitches Feat. Gudda Gudda"

Smoke DZA - T.H.C.
"Loaded"
"Loaded (Remix)" ft. Schoolboy Q

Maybach Music Group - Self Made Vol. 1
"That Way" (Wale & Rick Ross featuring Jeremih)
"Big Bank" (Pill, Rick Ross, Meek Mill & Torch featuring French Montana)

Juicy J - Rubba Band Business 2 (mixtape)
"A Zip And A Double Cup"
"So Damn Fucked Up"
"Money Money To Make Money"
"Inhale" (featuring Machine Gun Kelly)
"Who Da Neighbors"
"Met The Wrong Gun"
"Smoke That Bitch" (featuring VABP)
"Bombay Gin Dance"
"Erryday" (featuring Wiz Khalifa)
"Killa"
"Introduce" (featuring Don Trip)
"Pills, Weed & Pussy" (featuring Project Pat)
"Get To Meet A G"
"Strapped With The Strap"
"White Girl"
"Make It Happen" (featuring Casey Veggies)
"Street Shit"
"What The Fuck Is Yall On"

2 Chainz - T.R.U. REALigion
"Undastatement" (produced with Southside)
"Money Makin Mission"

Sharky - The Takeover
"Murder Scene" (featuring Compton Menace)
"Step Out (featuring Doey)
"Cali Back (featuring Helen & Mil)
"My Money"
"Why They Mad" (featuring Brose Royce)
"My World"
"2 Many" (featuring PC)
"Takeover" (featuring D Realz & Cold Flamez)
"Ain't Started Yet" (featuring Doey)
"420" (featuring Tay & F3rd)
"Self Paid"
"Trap Zone"
"Saggin'In My 501's" (featuring RK)
"I'm On It" (featuring Breez & Elz)

Fat Trel - APRIL FOOLZ
"Respect With the Tech"
"Tip A Strippa"

French Montana - Coke Boys 
"Is U Kiddin' Me (featuring Three 6 Mafia)

Ace Hood - Blood, Sweat & Tears
"Go 'N' Get It"
"Hustle Hard"
"Hustle Hard" (Remix) (featuring Rick Ross & Lil Wayne)
"Go 'N' Get It" (Remix) (featuring Beanie Sigel, Busta Rhymes, Pusha T & Styles P)

Game - California Republic (mixtape)
"Bottles & Rockin' J's" (featuring DJ Khaled, Busta Rhymes, Rick Ross, Fabolous & Lil Wayne)

Young Jeezy - The Real Is Back 
"All The Money" (featuring 211)

Kid Ink - Daydreamer
"Blackout" (featuring Meek Mill)

Gucci Mane - Writings on the Wall 2 
"Tragedy"
"Lil Friends"

Doe Boy & Lex Luger - Boyz n da Hood
"Boyz n Da Hood Pt. 2"
"Ricky"
"Ghost" (featuring Hollywood Goonie)
"Be About That" (featuring Goonie and Scrilla)
"Exposed"
"Disaster" (featuring Moptop Marley; co-produced by Bobby Kritical)
"Shout Out" (featuring Nino Cahootz and K-Tee; co-produced by Southside)
"Str8 From Da Block"
"Swag School"
"Death Row"
"Think About It"
"Squad Up" (featuring Da Kid)

Waka Flocka Flame - Lebron Flocka James 2
"Bricksquad Trappin"
"Hard Work Pays Off"
"Bout A Dollar"
"To Da Max"
"Hard In The Paint"
"Wats Bangin"

DJ Khaled - We the Best Forever
"Money" (featuring Young Jeezy & Ludacris)
"I'm Thuggin'" (featuring Waka Flocka Flame & Ace Hood)

David Blayne - R&B Straight Drop (The Cook Up)
"Off Da Chain"

Just Rich Gates - Merk Star Gates 2
"What (Remix)"
"We Luv Dat"
"Yea I'm Trappin"
"Playin' Defense" ft. Waka Flocka Flame, Slim Dunkin, & VA

V.A.B.P. - Young Nigga Movement
"Pop A Bean"
"Back It Up" (featuring Juicy J & Trey Songz)
"Lean" (feat. Juicy J)
"New Hoes" (featuring Juicy J)
"Chopper Loose" (featuring Project Pat)
"Oh Well" (featuring Juicy J & 2 Chainz)
"Shades On" (featuring Juicy J & Spinks)
"Work Out" (featuring Juicy J)
"Act A Fool"
"Now" (featuring Project Pat)
"TTG Wanna See"
"Maui Wowi"
"7 Dayz" (featuring Juicy J)
"I Can't Remember Da Last Time" (featuring Juicy J)
"Smoke That Bitch" (featuring Juicy J)

Soulja Boy Tell 'Em - Bernard Arnault EP
"Texas"

Lil Wyte - I Aint Dead
"Money" (featuring Partee, Project Pat & Miss Wyte)

Waka Flocka Flame - Salute Me Or Shoot Me 2.5
"Keep It Real"
"Da Block Hot"
"Fuck Da Police"
"Give It 2 Me"
"Yeah Nigga"
"Call Waka"
"On My Shyt"
"What Set U Claim"
"Ride Wit My Niggaz"

Ben Beamon - Get Well Soon
"Red"
"Skiin' Thru Da Snow"
"Whitegirl Sellin' Whitegirl"
"Dumbin' Out"
"For Sure"
"Like A Billy"
"Whorez"
"Dude You're Screwed"
"Bustin' Bells"

Jim Jones - Capo
"Hockey Bag" (featuring Cam'ron & Juelz Santana) (Bonus Track)

Waka Flocka Flame & Slim Dunkin - Twin Towers 2 (No Fly Zone)
"Koolin It" (featuring YG Hootie and Kebo Gotti)
"Lightz On" (featuring Gucci Mane)
"Wrong One Ta Try" (featuring French Montana)

Lil Scrappy - Tha Merlo Jonez EP
"Arguin'"

Rich Kid Shawty - Word In da South
"Word Round Da South"
"Never Stop"
"We Working"

Wale - Ambition
"That Way" (featuring Jeremih & Rick Ross)

Lil Wayne - Sorry 4 the Wait
"Grove St. Party" (featuring Lil B)

Juicy J - Blue Dream & Lean
"Intro"
"Drugged Out"
"Riley"
"Get Higher"
"Oh Well (Remix)" (featuring 2 Chainz)
"She Dancin'"
"This Bitch By My Side"
"Cash (Interlude)"
"You Want Deez Rackz" (Prod. with Sonny Digital)
"A Zip And A Double Cup (Remix)" (featuring 2 Chainz & Tha Joker)
"Gotta Stay Strapped" (featuring Project Pat & Alley Boy)
"I Don't Play With Gunz" (featuring Project Pat & Alley Boy)

Frenchie - Bringing Gangsta Back
"My Lifestyle"
"Catch A Charge"
"Take Sum" (featuring Project Pat)

OJ da Juiceman - The Lord of the Rings
Back From The Dead
Niggaz In My Business
Cook It Up Y'all
No Help

Waka Flocka Flame & French Montana - Lock Out
"Black"  (featuring Slim Dunkin and Chinx Drugz)
"Still"
"Weed & Drinks" (featuring Chinx Drugz)

CTC Crazy - Da Young Gunnaz
"Ovas"
"Wild Life"
"Pac Man"

Frenchie - Chicken Room
"Lord I'm Tired"

Rich Hil - 500 Grams
"Slippin' Into Darkness"
"Half A P"
"Cherry Pie" (featuring Smoke DZA)
"500 Grams"
"Varieties" (featuring Ro Ransom)
"Just Like That" (featuring Boo-Bonic)
"It Ain't Time To Go"
"Ring Around The Rosie"
"What's Poppin'"
"Baby Mix It Up"
"Dippin'" (featuring Boo-Bonic)
"Show Money"
"Bout It, Bout It"

Black Boy da Kid - Cut the Check 2
"Money on My Mind"

2 Chainz - Codeine Cowboys (A 2 Chainz Collection)
"Too Easy"  (featuring Cap1)
"Kitchen"  (featuring Young Jeezy and Pusha T)

Frank Whyte - Registered Real Nigga
Money So Tall (Yao Ming)
Doing It

Wooh Da Kid - Krown the King
"My Benz" (featuring P Smurf, Ice Burgandy and Waka Flocka Flame)

Bo Deal - The Chicago Code 2
"Grindin'"

Waka Flocka Flame - Salute Me Or Shoot Me 3 (Hip Hops Outcast)
"Damn"
"More"
"365"

Tay Don - Death Of Tay Beatz (The Rise Of Tay Don)
"M.O.B."
"Shootout"
"Hustle Grind"
"Throw Up Ur Set" (ft. Lady Jade)

Wooh Da Kid - Strap-A-Holics
"Pass"  (featuring YG Hootie & Frenchie)
"No Romance"

Tinie Tempah - Happy Birthday
"Leak-a-mixtape"  (featuring Giggs)

KayO Redd - YNS (The Rise of Sykho Soulja)
"Neutron"
"Geeked Up"
"Rap Niggaz Funny"

Da KID & Slim Dunkin' - Bad Boys
"To Da Max"
"Dunk"

Mack Mecca & BFN - Head of the Class
"Strapped BFN"

Smoke DZA - SweetBabyKushedGod
"SWV" (feat. Domo Genesis & Mookie Jones)

Tyga - #BitchImTheShit
"Orgasm"

Soufboi - Street Made 3
"What I Like To Do"
"Love When They Hatin'"

Smoke DZA - Sweet Baby Kushed God
"SMV"  ft. Mookie Jones & Domo Genesis

M.A.T.H.
"No Trespassin"

Frank Math  
 "It's All There"

Young Lace - Cruise Control 
"Moneygram" (ft. KTB)
"Sippin Champagne"
"Never Sleep"
"Muscle Bars" (feat. KTB & Inner G)

Waka Flocka Flame - Ten Seventeen Bricksquad
 "I'm Just Livin Life"

SL Jones - The Number 23
"Michael Jordan"

Calico Jonez & T.K. 100Rackz
"Firebirdz"

Young Cazal & DJ Fletch - Im On My Way
"Regardless"

So Tatted Boys
"So Cold" (ft. So Tatted Sharky)

Privilege - The Playbook
"This The Life" (ft. Waka Flocka Flame)

Killa Kyleon -  Candy Paint N Texas Plates 2 (Hosted by DJ Rapid Ric)
"Bodies Hit The Floor" (feat. Bun B)

Pricele$$
"First 48"

Trae The Truth - 48 Hours 
"Earthquake"

Da Kid - Bad Boys for Life
"No Subliminals" (ft. Slim Dunkin)

Lil Twist - The Golden Child
"Light Up"
"Reckless"

Bo Deal - Good Side Bad Side
"What Up"

2012

J Money - Who Shot Ya
"Bags" (ft. MPA Wicked)

Fat Trel
"Fukkk Da Feds" (ft. Chief Keef)

Jody Breeze - Airplane Mode
"Problem" (ft. Zed Zilla)

Chevy Woods - Gangland
"12 Rounds"
"Vice" (feat. Juicy J & Wiz Khalifa)
"36" (ft. Trae The Truth)

MellowHigh - The OF Tape Vol. 2
"Timbs"

JD Era - No HandoutsJD Era - No Handouts // Free Mixtape @ DatPiff.com
"Yoga Flame"
"Smoking Good"

Styles P - The Diamond Life Project
"YO Trill Sheet" (ft. Sheek Louch & Bun B)

2WIN - Imagine
"MLK"

Ghosty Lowks - Sick City Volume 1
"Bustin"

Vinny Chase - Survival of the Swag
"Urban Outfitters"

Chief Keef - For Greater Glory Vol. 1
"Russian Roulette" (featuring Fat Trel)

Rick Ross - Rich Forever
"Off The Boat" (featuring French Montana)

EMP Dasme - Lakeshore Living
"Lil Mama"

Schoolboy Q - Habits & Contradictions
"Grooveline Pt. 1" (featuring Curren$y & Dom Kennedy)

Chip tha Ripper - Tell Ya Friends
"Out Here"

Yo Gotti - Live From The Kitchen
"Second Chance"

YG Hootie - Fonk Love (Flight to da Motherland)
"Puttin' In Work"
"Everything Bricksquad"

Project Pat & Nasty Mane - Belly On Full
"Money Mane" (featuring 2 Chainz & Tatalalicious)

Doe Boy - Since 1994 Pt. 2
"Since 1994 Pt.2""
"It's Whatever" (featuring Sean Teezy)

Trap Music: Gorilla Warfare (Hosted by Gorilla Zoe)
"Spit In Yo Face" (performed by Gorilla Zoe)

King Louie - Showtime
"Feelin' Like A Big Check"

Tay Don - Death of Tay Beatz 2 (Tay Dons Day of Wreckoning)
"Get Ur Thug On"
It's Goin' Down"
Throw Up Ur Set"
"Triple Dare"
"Shootout"
"Don't Blow My High"

French Montana, Juicy J & Project Pat - Cocaine Mafia
"Catch Ya Later"
"Is You Kiddin Me" (featuring DJ Paul)

Tarvoria - Bedroom Bangers
"Jumpin' Off The Dresser"

Tay Don - M.A.F.I.A.
"Salute"
"Comfortable Darkness"

Wooh Da Kid - Strap-A-Holics 2.0 (Reloaded)
"Bricksquad Diva" (featuring Waka Flocka Flame, Slim Dunkin and Gucci Mane)

Wiz Khalifa - Taylor Allderdice
"The Code" (featuring Juicy J, Lola Monroe & Chevy Woods)

Mac Miller - Macadelic
"Lucky Ass Bitch'" (featuring Juicy J)

Bo Deal & Co Still - Niggaz You Love To Hate
"Not A Game" (featuring BFN)

Game - California Republic
"Death Penalty'" (featuring Fabolous, Slim Thug and Eric Bellinger)
"Bottles And Rockin' J's'" (Remix) (featuring Busta Rhymes, Rick Ross, Fabolous, Lil Wayne and Teyana Taylor)

Ice Burgandy - Progress Involves Risk Unfortunately
"My Benz'" (featuring Wooh Da Kid, P Smurf  and Waka Flocka Flame)

French Montana & Coke Boys - Coke Boys 3
"9000 Watts '"

GE Da Piolet - Project F16
"Mission"
"Hold Me Down"

MellowHigh
"Timbs'"

Juicy J - Blue Dream & Lean (Bonus Track)
"I'm Ballin'"

Gucci Mane - I'm Up

"Spread the Word"

Lil Wyte - Still Doubted?
"All Kinds Of Drugs" (featuring Young Buck and Lil Wil) (Produced with Big BOI Beats)
"Welcome 2 the Gathering" (featuring  Lord Infamous and Liquid Assassin) (Produced with Wyte Music Rec)
"Money" (featuring Miss Wyte, Partee, and Project Pat)
"Lost In My Zone"

Waka Flocka Flame - Triple F Life: Friends, Fans and Family
"Triple F Life (Intro)" (with Southside)
"Round of Applause" (featuring Drake)
"Triple F Life (Outro)" (with Southside)

Doe Boy - Paid In Full
"Respect My Fresh"

CyHi The Prynce - Ivy League Club
"Real Talk"  (featuring Dose)

Sergei Barracuda - Pouliční Ekonomická II
"Šéfuju"
"Monte Carlo" (featuring Smack)
"Ice Cube"

Big Sean - Detroit
"FFOE"

V.A.B.P. - Young Nigga Movement 2
"Tonight"
"Hearse"
"Unf*ckwitable"
"Whip Da Shake" (featuring Fat Trel)
"Smoke a Joint"
"Choppa Lay 'Em Down" (featuring Juicy J)
"Molly" (featuring Neal Da Hitman)
"Crash the Party"
"Fucked Up" (featuring Fam-Lay)
"O Well (Remix)"
"How You Gone Act"
"Hello Goodbye" (featuring Neal Da Hitman)
"Ciroc Boyz"

Fat Trel - Nightmare on E Street 
"Geetchie"
"Rollin" (featuring Rich Hil)

Zone 6 Sinister - The Sixth Sense
"Death Before Dishonesty"

Future - Invade The Game
"Fettuccine" (ft. Pusha T & Emilio Rojas)

Chief Keef - Determined to Hustle 4
"Clap" ft. (Bo Deal & Uncle Murda)

2013

G.E. Da Piolet - I.C.O.N.
"Mission (Remix)" (ft. Bo Deal)
"Raw & Uncut"

Riff Raff
"Raiders Vs. Hawks"

Zone 6 Sinister - Zone 6 Stephen King
 "Spring Time" (feat. Pakktrick Peezy)

Styles P - Freestyle Massacre (Hosted by DJ Ben Frank)
"Enjoy The Atmosphere" (ft. Chris Rivers & Tyler Woods)

YS FXXL - Tatted B4 The Deal 
"999"

Yung Chuck - Bouta Boom 
 "Boom"

ikabodVeins - FUCK$
"Intro"
"FUCK$"
"Oh My God"
"Bogus"
"Derringer 22"
"96 Impala SS"
"Break Lights"
"That's My Shit" (feat. Griff)

Cartel MGM - Cartel MGM & Lex Luger - Down South Mex
 "Intro" 
 "Down South Mex"  
 "Clika De La Kush/ Kush Clique"
 "Feeling Good" 
 "Bitch Get Off Me"  
 "I Bet "
 "Big Faces" (feat. Young Dolph)  
 "Bands Up"  
 "Hollywood" (feat. Yowda) 
 "Take His Head Off His Shoulders" (feat. Project Pat) 
 "Circle Small"  
 "Never Change"  
 "In & Out The Door"  
 "Do You Feel Me?"  
 "Outro"

Project Pat - Cheez N Dope 
"Niggas Bleed Like I Bleed"
"You Kno What It Is"

Cyhi The Prynce - Ivy League: Kick Back 
"Far Removed"

Curren$y - New Jet City 
"Choosin" (featuring Wiz Khalifa & Rick Ross)
"Coolie in the Cut" (featuring Trademark da Skydiver)

Waka Flocka Flame - DuFlocka Rant 2 
"Stay Hood" (featuring Lil Wayne)
"Fell" (featuring Gucci Mane & Young Thug)
"Real Recognize Real"

M Watts - The Layover EP 
"Liberachi" (featuring Pusha T)

Gucci Mane & Young Scooter - Free Bricks 2 
"Pass Around" (featuring Wale)

Gucci Mane - Trap God 2 
"Scholar"

Gucci Mane & Young Dolph - EastAtlantaMemphis 
"I Ain't Even Gonna Lie"
"On The Run"
"Tell Me Nothin"

OJ da Juiceman - 6 Ringz 2 (The Playoffs Edition) 
"Run Them Bands Up" 
"Ballin Out The Gym" (featuring Starlito)

French Montana - Excuse My French 
"40" (featuring Trey Songz & Fabolous)

Travis Scott - Owl Pharaoh 
"M.I.A."

Gucci Mane - Trap House III 
"Can't Trust Her" (featuring Rich Homie Quan)

Big Bank Black - The Godfather 
"Forgiato's" (featuring Gucci Mane)

Blood Money - Drug Wars 
"GBSB"

Doe Boy - In Freebandz We Trust
"Band God"

Ricky Hil - Slickville 2
"Off Probation"

The Underachievers - Lords of Flatbush 
"Leaving Scraps"
"Flexin"
"Cold Crush"
"Still Shining"
"Fake Fans"

Fredo Santana - Ballout - From The Streets
"Street Niggas" (featuring Ballout and Gino Marley)

Fredo Santana - Trappin Ain't Dead 
"Clockwork"
"Came Up From Nothing"
"Ring Bells"

Juicy J - Stay Trippy 
"So Much Money" (co-produced by Crazy Mike and Juicy J)
"All I Blow is Loud"
"If I Ain't"

King Chip - 44108 
"Stand Up King"
"It's Real" (featuring Fat Trel)

Gucci Mane - Diary of a Trap God 
"She a Soldier" (featuring Rich Homie Quan)

Rich Homie Quan - I Promise I Will Never Stop Going In 
"Cash Money" (featuring Birdman)  (co-produced by Metro Boomin)

Fredo Santana - Its A Scary Site 2
"No Hook"

Spodee - No Pressure 2
"Intro"

2014

King Phil
"Long Way"

Zach Farlow - The Great Escape
"Fukk Around"

Rick Ross - Hood Billionaire
"Hood Billionaire" (co-produced by Deedotwill)

Chief Keef - Single
"Save Me"

Young Money Entertainment - Young Money: Rise of an Empire
"Back It Up"

Low Pros - Low Pros EP 1
"Intro" 
"100 Bottles" (Feat. Travi$ Scott) [Prod.with By A-Trak]
"Frankie Lymon" (Feat. Que, Young Thug & PeeWee Longway) [Prod. with A-Trak]
"Ohmygosh" [Prod. with A-Trak, Metro Boomin, High Klassified & Brillz]
"Jack Tripper" (Feat. Young Thug & PeeWee Longway) [Prod. with A-Trak, & Metro Boomin]
"Muscle" (Feat. Juvenile) [Prod. with A-Trak,  Metro Boomin & High Klassified]
"100 Bottles (Remix)" (Feat. Travi$ Scott & A$AP Ferg) [Prod. with A-Trak]

Young Dolph - - High Class Street Music 4 (American Gangster)
"Not No More" (co-produced by Metro Boomin)

DJ P Exclusivez - No Record Deal 3
"Bape" (HiRULE)
"Red Nation" (Fat Sauce ft. Bloody Jay)

Chinx Drugz - Cocaine Riot 4
"Let's Get it" ft. Young Thug

Lex Luger
"Legal" ft. Gangsta Boo
"Foreign"
"Poppin Percs" (ft. HighDefRazJah & Lipso)
"#100"
"Not Cool" (ft. Rari) [Prod. by UrBoyBlack]
"Randy Moss" (ft. Marlo Margiela) [Prod by. Jokaa]
"Off The Drugs" Young Cartel feat. Chella H & Lex Luger
"TUK (Turn Up Kings)" (feat. HighDefrazjah)
"Stripper Booty" (ft. J-Roc)

MPA Shitro - Son Of A Bricc Lady
"Dead and Gone" (co-produced with 808 Mafia)

Young Eddy - Welcome To A New Beginning 
"How It Goes" (ft. G.U.N MSE)

Zone 6 Sinister - No Day Off
"No Day Off"

UrBoyBlack 
"Why" - (ft. J Roc)

Rich the Kid - Streets On Lock IV
"Workin" (ft. Casey Veggies)

Neako - The Xan Band EP
"Super Xan Bros" ft. The Clouds & Young Musis
"xanLAND Airlines"
"LVLLEX"

Reese Kool
 "Bubble" ft. Shy Glizzy

Gucci Mane - Brick Factory Vol. 2
"Stay Down" (feat. Rocko)

Ace Santana - I Am Ace Santana
"No Hook"

Hunter - Hunter Perry 
"Rally"

King Kuma
"On Star"

La Melle Robinson - War of the Worlds
"I'm Not The Same"

Dre Loco 
"Hustle Hard 2K14"

DayMoe
"How We Live" (ft. Lil Jay)

Mack Maine - Food For Thought
"Living All Of Your Dreams" ft. (2 Chainz & Mac Miller)

Frank Whyte & Pop-A-Lot - The Kush Administration
"Ride High"

Deaveru
"Mario Kart"
"Shutter Island"

Rico Ramone - Signed and Sealed
"Goin In"

DayMoe - First Assault
"Get Paid" (ft. Lil Jay)

Doe Bear & Milli Marley - Mobbin
"Long Hair Fatty"

Whiteboy Tommy
"One Thing About Me" (feat. A-Wax)
"Living That Life"

Sheila D - Grand By Design
"Thunder" (ft. Lex Luger and Marlo Margiela)

OG Maco - OG Maco
"Seizure" (ft. JerZ) (co-produced with Deedotwill)

2015

Marlo Margiela
"Throw A Fit" (feat. Lex Luger & P Wild)
"We On Now" (feat. Lex Luger) 
"Never fall in Love" (feat. Lex Luger)
"Freebase" (feat. Fattrel)
"Faces" 
"Doprah" 
"Last Year" (feat. Lil Durk)

Whiteboy Tommy - Hollywood Stories: The Prelude
"All I Do"
"The Motive" 
"One Of Those Days"

Neako - #Junkie 
"Look At The Time" (co-produced with TM88)

Juicy J - O's To Oscars
"Disrespectin" (co-produced with  Juicy J, Lil Awree, & Crazy Mike)

Kris Dutney
"MIA"
"Ocean" (ft. Lex Luger)

Keez Moni - Harold's Chicken & Kush Blunts
"Ride Smooth"

J. Money - Sauce 4 Sale
"Let's Do It" (feat. Frenchie)

JayyRaw
"I Know" (co-produced with 808 Mafia)

Gandhi
"Hare Krishna"

Hakim Lemon Haze - Adromicfms 2 
"LA Diferencia" (ft. Yung Beef)

Pyrobethename - Egyptian God
"My Sins" (co-produced by Reaperonthatrack)

HighDefRazjah - Drug Habits
"Movie Star"

Kourtney Money & Young Nudy - Paradise 2 East Atlanta
"My Nigga" (ft. D.R.E.)

Katie Got Bandz - Zero to 39th
"A1" (ft. OTF Savage)

C. Carter - Compton Carter
"West"
"Goin Up"

Kourtney Money - The Return of Money (Zone 6 Edition)
"9 On Me"

Young Cartel
"Homicide" (ft. Cartel Kapo)

Franco Gianni
"Xolos"

Slim B
"Hood Billionaire"

Key Nyata - Indiana Facers
"Thraxx On Me"

Lex Luger
"MVP" (ft. HighDefRazjah) [Prod. By Mike Mizzle] 
"4:57 AM" (ft. King Duke) [Prod. By Mike Mizzle]
"#WeOnTV" (ft. Lipso) [Prod. By Deedotwill and MVCK]
"Selfish" (ft. Lex Luger, Yung Kris, King Duke, and KapBoy)

King Kuma & Lex Luger - Gas-A-Holic 2
 "CreatureStyle Intro" (feat. Creature)
 "Lex Luger Speaks"
 "Gold Mine" (feat. Lex Luger)
 "Robert Earl House" 
 "OnStar" 
 "Loft" (Feat. Petey Mo & Young Chevy) 
 "Lex Luger Speaks 2"
 "In Da Wurl" (feat. Young Chevy)
 "Unattractive" (feat. Project Pat)
 "Errythang About Her" 
 "Lex Luger Speaks 3"
 "GASoLEAN" 
 "Early"
 "Glacier" 
 "Lex Luger Speaks 4"
 "Really Been"
 "Like 50K" (feat. King Kuma) 
 "Curtains" (feat. Rich The Kid & Casey Veggies) 
 "Bubba" 
 "Disguise" (feat. Tago) 
 "Time" (feat. Brandon Cain)

OJ da Juiceman -  The Realest Nigga I Know 2
"Work"
"Hot Tamale"

Rick Ross - TBA
"Dog Food"

Cartel Kapo - Thousand Pounds
"Intro (Get Sum Money)"
"Touch Down"
"RIP" 
"In Da Trap"
"YNG" 
"Choppa Make You Dead" 
"What You No"
"Time" 
"Cash Out" 
"Outro" 
"Homicide" (feat. Young Cartel)

Juicy J - 100% Juice
"Details" (co-produced with TM88)
"Touch Da Sky First" (co-produced with Metro Boomin, Sonny Digital, Southside & Crazy Mike)

Yung Kris
"Lean With The Xanis"

Father - Someone Get These New Niggas
"Alleyoop Swish" (ft. LuiDiamonds)

J Roc
"Dope" (ft. Milli)

KapboyDaMacboy
"Rare"

Gucci Mane - East Atlanta Santa 2
"Prey" (ft. Waka Flocka Flame and OG Maco)
"What it Takes" (ft. Vic Mensa and Bandman Kavo)

2016

GC54PROD & Lex Luger GotInstrumentals x GC54PROD 2 
 "GC & Lex" instrumental 131BPM (produced with GC54PROD)
 "Deadly zone" instrumental 140BPM (produced with GC54PROD)
 "Masters at work" instrumental 140BPM (produced with GC54PROD)
 "Let's Crunk this Trap!!" instrumental 137BPM (produced with GC54PROD)
 "Rollin" 142BPM instrumental 142BPM (produced with GC54PROD)
 "GC54 Team" (feat. Alibi Montana x Devil B x R.E.D x Setekh x Jokno Condor) (produced with GC54PROD)

Wiz Khalifa - Khalifa 
 "Bake Sale" (feat. Travis Scott & Juicy J)

Big Biz Da MC
"Agent P"

Trill Murray
"R∆ POWER"

Young Crazy & Breeze Barker - Count Dat Money 7 (Hosted By OJ Da Juiceman)
"Hallway" (produced with DJ Kino Beats)

Juicy J - RBB3 
 "No English" (feat. Travis Scott)

PHRHX - Prologue
"Good A$$ Time"

Little Pain
"Ashamed Of Myself" (ft. Lil Peep)

Lex Luger
"Movie" (ft. J-Real and Mi$tro) 
"Marlo Margiela - Never Fall In Love" ft Lex Luger

Ricky Hil & Lex Luger - 500 Grams
"Half a P"
"Born In the 90's"
"Cherry Pie" (ft. Smoked DZA)
"500 Grams "
"Varieties" (feat. Ro Ransom) 	
"Ring Around the Rosie"
"What's Poppin"
"Baby Mix It Up"
"Dippin"
"Show Money" (feat. Bonic) 	
"Bout It 'Bout It"

Lex Luger - The Lex Luger Experience: The Tour Vol. 1
"Lex Luger Experience: The Tour, Vol. 1" (ft. Kino Beats)
"White Bars 6"
"Base Side"
"Movie" (ft. Kino Beats)
"White Bars 8"
"Backwoods"
"The OG"
"Commas" (ft. HighDefRazjah & KinoBeats)
"Epic Lives" (ft. Markino Hay & KinoBeats)
"Lex Kino Black" (ft. KinoBeats & UrBoyBlack)
"Cocaine" (ft. Trama Tone & KinoBeats)

ASAP Ferg - Always Strive and Prosper
"Let It Bang" (ft. Schoolboy Q)

HighDefRazjah - Psychedelic
"The Art of Psyche"
"Swervin Lanes"
"Arenas"

Hefna Gwap
"When I Get Some Dope"

WhiteboyTommy - YNS: Young N Successful
"The Only Thing"
"Gwop Getta"

Malcolm Anthony & Lex Luger  - 1804
"Like Me"
"Game Recognize Game"
"The Oath" (ft. Terry Mak)
"Finally"

G.O.O.D. Music - Cruel Winter
"Champions" (Kanye West featuring Travis $cott, Quavo, Gucci Mane, Yo Gotti, Big Sean, 2 Chainz & Desiigner)

JPrice
"3 AM"

Drama Boi
"Deadman"

Lil Champ FWAY
"Coconut Grove"

Larry June - Good Job Larry Pt. 2
"B.A.B." (ft. OG Maco & Chevy Woods)

Malcolm Anthony
"Finally"

RetroI$Awesome - 72-10 
"Count It Up" 
"Swi$H" 
"Whenever I Wanna" 
"“4 in a 2”" 
"All We Do" 
"Breakin The Law"

Eddy Baker
"ROWDY"

V.A.B.P. - V.A.B.P. - Pre Game
"Real Nigga"
"Ball Out" 
"Don't Lose Ya Life"

Almighty Dip - DipLLuminati : The 7 Day Theory
"Pass Around"

Curtis Williams - Danco SZN
 "No Reason"

Juicy J - #MUSTBENICE
"Trap" (ft. Gucci Mane and Peewee Longway) 
"Plenty" (ft. Que)

OJ da Juiceman - Math Class
"Mudd"

Fresh Moss - Skinny Fresco 2
"Insomniac"

Curtis Williams - #DancoSZN 
"No Reason"

Taylor J & Lex Luger Presents - The 91Family
"'91 Family Forever"
"Dawg"
"Pop Dat"
"Hard Ta Luv"
"Do For Me"
"Hotel"
"HighLight"
"Workin"

GC54
 "Masters at Work"

Les Anticipateurs - La Coupe
"Paradis"

Les Anticipateurs - Match des Étoiles
"NOUVEAU"

Kevin Hart - Kevin Hart: What Now?
 "Baller Alert" (ft. Migos & T.I)

Princess Nokia - 1992
 03. "Kitana"

Devereaux - Casualties
 03. "Casualties" (ft. Ramirez, 6Cardinal, Shaggy, and Splxffy)

2017

Chief Keef - Two Zero One Seven

1."So Tree"* (Co- Produced with Suber)
4."Reefah"*
6."Short" ft. Tadoe* (Co- Produced with Suber)
11."Control" (ft. Tadoe)*

Taylor J

"Petty"
"Down"
"Feelings"

Curren$y & Lex Luger - The Motivational Speech EP
 "Get To It"
 "Lavender"
 "In The Lot"
 "Pressure"
 "I Know"

2018

Chief Keef - Ottopsy (EP)
 "Gang Gang"

Rico Nasty - Nasty
 "Transformer"

2019

Jeezy - TM104: The Legend of the Snowman

"MLK BLVD" (featuring Meek Mill)

A.U. WOOD - Summer's Mine (EP)
 "Run It Part II" (featuring Sai What)

Gucci Mane - Woptober II

"Richer than Errybody" (featuring YoungBoy Never Broke Again and DaBaby)

2020

Juicy J - The Hustle Continues
 "Gah Damn High" (featuring Wiz Khalifa) 
produced with Juicy J

2021

MVW
 "Still Do" (featuring Valee)
co-produced with MVW

Teejayx6 - Generation Scam (EP)
 "Triler"
 "EDD Baby" (ft. 24hrs)
 "Hit Stick"
 "Dumpin'"
 "Shoot"
 "Too Loyal" (ft. Boldy James)
EP produced by Lex Luger

2022

King Chip - Bonfire
 "Don't You See I'm on the Phone!?"
 "No, YOU Keep Cool"
 "All I Know"
 "Hurtin' They Feelings"
 "Blue Hunnets"
 "BussIt"
 "Acting Brand New"
 "Do Some Damage"

All tracks produced by Lex Luger

References

Discographies of American artists
Hip hop discographies
Production discographies